Agyrta macasia is a moth of the subfamily Arctiinae. It was described by Schaus in 1924. It is found in Ecuador.

References

Moths described in 1924
Arctiinae
Moths of South America